Bnei Herzliya Basket (lit. Sons of Herzliya), is a professional basketball club that is based in Herzliya, in the Sharon district in Israel. The club plays in the Israeli Basketball Premier League, the top division of Israeli basketball. It has won the Israeli State Cup twice, most recently in 2022. This season the club will also play in the Basketball Champions League (BCL), one of Europe's largest international competitions.

History
The club was originally founded in 1985, under the name Hapoel Herzliya. In 2002, the club merged with Maccabi Ra'anana in a neighboring town, and was re-named Bnei HaSharon. The merger was entered into because of Maccabi Ra'anana's financial problems and Bnei HaSharon's relegation from the top-level Israeli Basketball Premier League, following the 2001–02 season. 

At the end of 2010–11 season, the merger ended, and the team started playing only for the Israeli city of Herzliya. In 2012, the club was re-named Bnei Herzliya. In 2022, the club won the Israeli State Cup for the second time, beating Hapoel Tel Aviv 87:82 in the final.

Titles and honors

Domestic competitions
Israeli State Cup
 Winners (2): (1994–95, 2021–2022)
 Runners-up (2): (2004–05, 2006–07)

Season by season

Players

Current roster

Depth chart

Notable players

 
 Paul Thompson 3 seasons: '92–'95
 Earl Williams 1 season: '93–'94
 John Hudson 3 seasons: '93–'96
 Steve Malovic 1 season: '95–'96
 David Thirdkill 1 season: '95–'96
 Lior Arditi 3 seasons: '95–'98
 Amir Muchtari 3 seasons: '95–'98
 Terence Stansbury 1 season: '96–'97
 Todd Mitchell 1 season: '96–'97
 Darnell Robinson 1 season: '97–'98
 Tal Burstein 3 seasons: '97–'00
 Terrence Rencher 3 seasons: '97–'99, '05–'06
 Augenijus Vaškys 1 season: '98–'99
 Petar Arsić 1 season: '98–'99
 Mark Dean 1 season: '98–'99
 Yaniv Green 3 seasons: '98–'00, '01–'02
 Norris Coleman 1 season: '99
 Greg Sutton 1 season: '99–'00
 Ufuk Sarıca 1 season: '01
 Tyson Wheeler 1 season: '01–'02
 Bryan Bracey 1 season: '01–'02
 Kenny Williams 1 season: '01–'02
 Andrew Kennedy 1 season: '01–'02
 Jarod Stevenson 3 seasons: '01, '02–'04
 Guy Pnini 4 seasons: '02–'06
 Meir Tapiro 3 seasons: '03–'04, '07–'09
 Alvin Young 1 season: '04–'05
 Nitzan Hanochi 5 seasons: '05–'08, '18–present
 Ugonna Onyekwe 3 seasons: '05–'06, '08–'10
 Ousmane Cisse 4 seasons: '05–'09
 Cookie Belcher 5 seasons: '05–'10
 Lee Nailon 2 seasons: '06–'07, '10–'11
 Jason Williams 3 seasons: '06–'08, '11–'12
 Erez Katz 6 seasons: '06–'12
 Shawn James 3 season: '08–'11
 Ira Newble 1 season: '09
 Isaac Rosefelt 4 seasons: '09–'13
 P. J. Tucker 1 season: '10
 Maceo Baston 1 season: '10–'11
 Dan Grunfeld 2 seasons: '10–'11, '13–'14
 Bryant Dunston 1 season: '11
 Ekpe Udoh 1 season: '11
 Tweety Carter 1 season: '11–'12
 Derrick Caracter 1 season: '12–'13
 Jumaine Jones 1 season: '12–'13
 Romel Beck 1 season: '12–'13
 Michael Umeh 1 season: '13–'14
 Oz Blayzer 2 seasons: '13–'15
 Josh Selby 1 season: '14–'15
 Julian Wright 1 season: '15
 Drew Crawford 1 season: '15–'16
 Karam Mashour 3 seasons: '15–'17, '18–'19
 Tom Maayan 3 seasons: '15–'18
 Taurean Green 2 seasons: '16–'18
 Jeff Adrien 3 seasons: '16–'19
 Orr Leumi 4 seasons: '16–20

 Shimon Amsalem

References

External links
Official website 
Eurobasket.com Team Profile

1985 establishments in Israel
Basketball teams established in 1985
Basketball teams in Israel
Israeli Basketball Premier League teams